Peters Township is the name of some places in the U.S. state of Pennsylvania:

Peters Township, Franklin County, Pennsylvania
Peters Township, Washington County, Pennsylvania

Pennsylvania township disambiguation pages